Barnacullian is a mountain in County Wicklow, Ireland. At 714 metres (2,306 ft) it is the 14th highest mountain in the Wicklow Mountains. It is located just north of Wicklow Mountains National Park.

See also
List of mountains in Ireland

References

Mountains and hills of County Wicklow
Geography of County Wicklow